Godwin–Knight House is a historic home located at Chuckatuck, Virginia. It was built in 1856, in the Federal style, then elaborately remodeled about 1898 in the Queen Anne style.  It is a -story, three-bay, double-pile side-hall-plan frame dwelling. hipped roof front porch. It features a wraparound porch and a corner tower with conical roof.  Also on the property are the contributing summer kitchen, smokehouse, woodshed / Delco house, two chicken house, a garage, and a barn / stable. It was the boyhood home of Virginia Governor Mills E. Godwin, Jr.

It was added to the National Register of Historic Places in 1985. It is located in the Chuckatuck Historic District.

References

Houses on the National Register of Historic Places in Virginia
Federal architecture in Virginia
Queen Anne architecture in Virginia
Houses completed in 1856
Houses in Suffolk, Virginia
National Register of Historic Places in Suffolk, Virginia
Individually listed contributing properties to historic districts on the National Register in Virginia